The black francolin (Francolinus francolinus) is a gamebird in the pheasant family Phasianidae of the order Galliformes. It was formerly known as the black partridge. It is the state bird of Haryana state, India (locally known as Kaala Teetar काला तीतर).

Taxonomy 

There are six recognized subspecies:
 F. f. francolinus (Linnaeus, 1766) - western black francolin - Cyprus, southern Turkey to Iraq and Iran
 F. f. arabistanicus (Zarudny and Harms, 1913) - Iranian black francolin - southern Iraq and western Iran
 F. f. asiae (Bonaparte, 1856) - Indian black francolin - northern India
 F. f. henrici (Bonaparte, 1856) - South Persian black francolin - southern Pakistan to western India
 F. f. bogdanovi (Zarudny, 1906) - southern Iran and Afghanistan to southern Pakistan
 F. f. melanonotus (Hume, 1888) - eastern India to Sikkim and Bangladesh.

Description
The black francolin has a length range around 33 to 36 cm and weight about 453 g (16 oz). The male is black with a white patch on the cheek, a chestnut collar and white spots on the flanks. The back and wings are scalloped with shades of golden brown with sub-terminal tawny-buff bands and pale edges. The rounded tail is black with narrow white or greyish bars. The legs and neck are reddish-brown to red. The extent of the white spotting on the flanks varies substantially across the species' range and the depth of colour of the females similarly varies. 

The female is mainly brown, but has a chestnut hind neck. The head is curved with brown irises, brown crown and black throat. The upper plumage, wings and tail as in the male, but the black is replaced by mottled brown and the brown bars on the lower back and tail are wider. The female is  duller, with no cheek patch, and the collar is replaced with a nuchal patch. The head and underparts are buff where the male shows black. The rump and upper tail coverts are light brown.

Similar species: the grey francolin has a grey-brown and buff body, buff instead of black throat, and lacks the rufous collar.

Voice
The call of the black francolin, described as a loud ringing "klik cheek-cheek-cheerakik", "kik-kik-kik" or "kwee-kweeeee-kwee", can be heard in the mornings and evenings and almost all day during the breeding season. The male calls while standing on an earth mound, bund, rock or a low tree branch and is soon joined by other birds answering from all directions.

Distribution and habitat

Black francolins are resident breeders from south-eastern Turkey eastwards through Iran to southwest Turkmenistan and northeast India, and Kazipara, Panchagarh of Bangladesh. The species' range was formerly more extensive, but over-hunting has reduced its distribution and numbers. Fragmented populations occur in the western part of its range.  

Black francolins were introduced to the Calcasieu and Cameron Parishes of southwestern Louisiana in 1961.  Additional introductions have also occurred in south Florida.  Elsewhere, black francolins have been introduced to the Caucasus, Guam, and the Hawaiian Islands.

The birds are found in scrubby habitats with plenty of cultivated crops tall enough to offer shelter and open beneath to provide escape routes and easy travel. They prefer areas of thick vegetation, usually near water. They are not forest birds but will frequent scrubland and forest edges associated with grassland. They appear to be more closely associated to water than chukars are, and in drier areas.

Behaviour
The black francolin only flies when disturbed. It has a pheasant's explosive flight, but prefers to creep away unseen. The flight is short and direct, punctuated by glides on rounded wings.

Breeding

Black francolins are monogamous. They normally nest in tall grasslands from late March to May. The male may be seen standing on a rock or low tree attracting attention with its extraordinary creaking call. It may be heard all day long in April, during nesting, and less persistently in March and May as well as the summer months. Both parents tend chicks after hatching. Young stay with parents through their first winter. The most likely breeding locations Savanna, Grasslands, Scrub vegetation areas under the cultivated crops. They have a loud call during the breeding season. Males may also become aggressive during the breeding season, make sure there is plenty of cover and escape routes for the hen and it maybe necessary to house her separate and allow limited access for breeding only. They are generally monogamous in the wild.

In aviculture it is best to house only one pair per aviary. Well planted aviaries with little surrounding traffic would be best for breeding. They are fairly winter hardy, but always provide some shelter during the coldest months breeds from late March to September depending on the range. The normal clutch size lies between 10 and 14 eggs, and only the hen incubates. The eggs are white-spotted olive or pale brown. The incubation period is 18 to 19 days, the breeding season is April to June and the young appear from April to October.

Feeding
The birds forage on the ground for plant material and small invertebrates, including grain, grass seeds, fallen berries, shoots, tubers, termites and ants. In aviculture they eat small mealworms and wax worms, but care must be used when feeding chicks as they are prone to toe-picking. .

References

External links 
 Informations and photos
 Photograph and description 
 Avicultural data

black francolin
Birds of Azerbaijan
Birds of Western Asia
Birds of Afghanistan
Birds of Pakistan
Birds of India
Birds of Nepal
Birds of Bangladesh
black francolin
black francolin
Symbols of Haryana